Cuthbert Nyasango (born 17 September 1982) is a Zimbabwean long-distance runner.  He was born in Nyanga.  Nyasango competed for Zimbabwe at the 2012 Summer Olympics in London where he placed seventh in the marathon and was the flag bearer for his country at the Closing Ceremony on 12 August 2012.

Achievements

Personal bests
1500 metres – 3:50.26 min (2003)
3000 metres – 7:51.29 min (2005)
5000 metres – 13:31.27 min (2007)
10,000 metres – 27:57.34 (2007) – national record
Half marathon – 1:00:26 hrs (2007)
Marathon – 2:09:52 hrs (2014)

References

External links

1982 births
Living people
Sportspeople from Manicaland Province
Zimbabwean male long-distance runners
Olympic athletes of Zimbabwe
Athletes (track and field) at the 2008 Summer Olympics
Athletes (track and field) at the 2012 Summer Olympics
Athletes (track and field) at the 2016 Summer Olympics
World Athletics Championships athletes for Zimbabwe